Cerrah is a town in İnegöl district of Bursa Province, Turkey. The population of Cerrah was 3707 . as of 2012. The historical serrlement was declared a seat of township in 1989. In addition to farming, furniture industry and trade in nearby İnegöl constitute a major source of revenue to the town. Along the Cerrah creek from Uludağ there are picnic areas established by the municipality. There is also a low power hydroelectric plant (800 000 kW-hr/year) on the creek.

References  

Villages in İnegöl District